Willie Minoga (born 17 September 1987) in Wapenamanda, Enga Province is a Papua New Guinean professional rugby league footballer who played for the Barrow Raiders in the Betfred Championship. He rejoined the Papua New Guinea Hunters at the end of 2016 after spending one season playing for the Townsville Blackhawks in the same competition. A Papua New Guinean national representative, Minoga was selected in PNG's squad for the 2017 World Cup.

At a very early age, he used to play for his schoolboy's rugby team while he was attending St.Paul's Lutheran Secondary School in the Minamb Valley, Enga Province in the years 2010-2012. He then joined Timin Tara, a local rugby team in the Minamb Rugby League. From there, he was directly invited by the Lae Snax Tigers coach Stanley Tepend for training. He played with the Lae Snax Tigers before he was selected for the PNG Hunters.
Story by: Kawaii Stan (Kepaku Warriors)

Playing career 
Minoga scored the match-winning try for the PNG Hunters in the 2017 Queensland Cup Grand Final against the Sunshine Coast Falcons.

References

External links
Papua New Guinea Hunters profile
Profile at Rugby League Project
2017 RLWC profile

1987 births
Living people
Barrow Raiders players
Papua New Guinea Hunters players
Papua New Guinea national rugby league team players
Papua New Guinean rugby league players
Rugby league centres
Rugby league wingers
Townsville Blackhawks players